Gohar Sultan Begum (died 1577) was the daughter of shah Tahmasp I of Persia (r. 1524–1576).

She was sister to shah Ismail II.

She was married to Ibrahim Mirza, whom she supported against her brother.

References

 Hani Khafipour. The Foundations of Safavid State: fealty, patronage, and ideals of authority (1501-1576). — Chicago, Illinois: The University of Chicago, 2013. — P. 254.

16th-century births
16th-century deaths
16th-century Iranian women
Safavid princesses